Kõima is a village in Audru Parish, Pärnu County, in southwestern Estonia. It has a population of 213 (as of 1 January 2011).

Since 1963 a sand and gravel quarry is operating in Potsepa, western part of Kõima. The quarry is also used for motocross events.

References

External links
AS Reiden, Potsepa quarry operator 

Villages in Pärnu County